Roads to Santiago is a 1992 travelogue by the Dutch writer Cees Nooteboom. It focuses on the pilgrim route to Santiago de Compostela in Spain.

Reception
The book was reviewed in Publishers Weekly: "The pilgrims' route to the cathedral in Santiago de Compostela in northern Spain has long been a favorite subject of travel writers, but few have covered it as entertainingly, quirkily and, finally, movingly as Dutch essayist Nooteboom (The Following Story)." The critic continued: "At one point, Nooteboom compares writing history to putting together a jigsaw puzzle. Anyone who hopes to find a compact history of Spain here will find some pieces missing. But what's here is an idiosyncratic, informative, introspective reading adventure."

See also
 1992 in literature
 Dutch literature

References

1992 non-fiction books
Dutch non-fiction books
Travel books
Camino de Santiago routes
Books about Spain
Pilgrimage accounts